David Charles Davies (1879 – 13 September 1956) was a Welsh footballer who played at outside-left for various minor sides around the turn of the twentieth century as well as making two appearances for Wales.

Football career
Davies was born in Talgarth, Breconshire and started his football career with the local village side before moving to the larger towns of Builth Wells and Brecon where he earned a reputation as a "star forward", being described in one report as "a very reliable forward, quick in his movements, accurate in his passes and deadly at goal".

His form for Brecon earned him his first cap for Wales in a 1–0 defeat against Ireland at Grosvenor Park, Belfast on 4 March 1899.

In the summer of 1899, he was offered professional terms by both the clubs then operating in Hereford, just across the border in England. He rejected the offer from Hereford Thistle (who were to fold later that summer) and signed with Hereford Town, then playing in the Birmingham & District League. Davies injured his knee in his first league match for Hereford, against Shrewsbury, which was to eventually end his career.

He made his second international appearance on 24 February 1900 when the Welsh defeated the Irish 2–0 at The Oval, Llandudno.

Despite several comeback attempts, the knee injury forced Davies to retire in October 1900. In 1908, he had recovered sufficiently to enable him to turn out occasionally for his village team.

Life outside football
Davies was employed by the General Post Office for many years and was awarded the Imperial Service Medal for long service.

References

External links

1879 births
1956 deaths
Welsh footballers
Wales international footballers
Hereford Town F.C. players
Association football forwards
People from Brecknockshire
Sportspeople from Powys